= PTTG3P =

Pseudogene in the species Homo sapiens

Identifiers
- Aliases
- External IDs: GeneCards: ; OMA:- orthologs
Orthologs
Species	Human	Mouse
Entrez	n/a	n/a
Ensembl	n/a	n/a
UniProt	n a	n/a
RefSeq (mRNA)	n/a	n/a
RefSeq (protein)	n/a	n/a
Location (UCSC)	n/a	n/a
PubMed search	n/a	n/a
- Wikidata
View/Edit Human

Pituitary tumor-transforming 3, pseudogene is a protein that in humans is encoded by the PTTG3P gene.
